K. Jayaraman, also known as K. Jayaram (born 8 April 1956) is an Indian cricketer, who played 46 first-class matches between 1977 and 1989. 

Jayaraman was a prominent player for Kerala in the 1980s. He gained national coverage in 1986-87, when he scored four hundreds in five matches in the Ranji Trophy and became the first Kerala player to come close to Indian team selection.

Jayaraman was Kerala's captain, and has since served as Kerala cricket's chairman of selectors. He has also served as a national junior selection committee member.

References

External links
 

1956 births
Living people
Kerala cricketers
Indian cricketers
Indian cricket administrators
Cricketers from Kochi